"Stasis Leak" is the fourth episode of the science fiction sitcom Red Dwarf series two and tenth in the series run. It premiered on the British television channel BBC2 on 27 September 1988.  Written by Rob Grant and Doug Naylor, and directed by Ed Bye, the crew travelling back in time, before the accident had wiped out the crew of Red Dwarf. The episode was re-mastered, along with the rest of the first three series, in 1998.

Plot
Arnold Rimmer becomes annoyed when he finds Dave Lister reading his diary. Lister stipulates it was essential when he reveals he found a wedding photo in the quarters of Kristine Kochanski (Clare Grogan), in which he was her groom, suspecting time travel is going to happen soon. Rimmer questions why reading the diary is essential, to which Lister points out it might be linked to his entry regarding the hallucinogenic mushroom incident – three million years in the past, Lister had been reprimanded by Captain Hollister (Mac McDonald) for giving Rimmer hallucinogenic mushrooms that led to him attacking two officers. Lister points out that Rimmer wrote about seeing himself as a hologram coming out of the table in their quarters, when he returned from the Captain's office, and hearing him state that he had come to the past from a stasis leak they had found. Lister determines that it really happened and not a hallucination as he assumed, and that they should investigate where the leak was found, after Holly (Norman Lovett) can't give any information on the subject.

The group traces the stasis leak and find it is a passageway to the past, to around three weeks before the Cadmium 2 accident that wiped out the crew. Discovering that the stasis leak prevents anything from the past being brought to the present, Lister and Rimmer each decide to use it still to make their futures better. While Rimmer uses it to find his past self and warn him of the upcoming accident, thus hoping he will get into stasis and avoid dying, Lister opts to find Kristine Kochanski (Clare Grogan) and have her use the ship's other stasis cell. Lister soon tracks her down to a hotel with Cat, he finds her already married to his future self from five years into the future, much to his confusion. When they rejoin Rimmer, they find him unsuccessfully convincing his younger self he is real. When future Lister and Kochanski arrive alongside future Rimmer, the matter becomes so complicated that past Rimmer decides to accept it only as a hallucination and asks them all to leave him alone.

Production
With its multiple views of the future, "Future Echoes" had been one of the better liked episodes from series I. With this in mind writers, Grant and Naylor, showed their desire to return to this story element with another sci-fi heavy story.

The "Crowne Plaza Midland Holiday Inn", in Manchester, was used as "The Ganymede Holiday Inn" where Lister and the Cat search for Kochanski. Grogan was released from the production without filming the final scene which involved her character Kochanski. Assistant floor manager Dona DiStefano stepped in to double as Kochanski, wearing a large hat to disguise the fact.

Returning pre-accident crew members include Mac McDonald as Captain Hollister, C. P. Grogan as Kochanski, Mark Williams as Petersen, and Sophie Doherty as Kochanski's friend. Morwenna Banks appears as the on-screen Lift Hostess, while Tony Hawks makes his third Red Dwarf guest appearance as the talking suitcase.

Reception
The episode was originally broadcast on the British television channel BBC2 on 4 October 1988 in the 9:00 pm evening slot. It received average television ratings. Fans considered the episode to be one of the better efforts from Series II, coming at 12th place overall in a Red Dwarf Smegazine readers' poll with 3.3% of the votes.

Remastering

The remastering of Series I to III was carried out during the late 1990s. Changes throughout the series included replacement of the opening credits, giving the picture a colour grade and filmising, computer generated special effects of Red Dwarf and many more visual and audio enhancements.

Changes made specific to "Stasis Leak" include the caption "Three million years earlier" has been removed from the opening flashback scenes. The stasis leak sound effects have been added. The split-screen wipe — with the older Lister shutting the door on his younger self — has been re-done frame by frame to remove previous errors.

References

Further reading

External links

Episode Guide – Series II at RedDwarf.co.uk

Red Dwarf II episodes
1988 British television episodes
Television episodes about time travel